Lanoe George Hawker,  (30 December 1890 – 23 November 1916) was a British flying ace of the First World War. Having seven credited victories, he was the third pilot to receive the Victoria Cross, the highest decoration for gallantry awarded to British and Commonwealth servicemen.

He was killed in a dogfight with the famous German flying ace Manfred von Richthofen ("The Red Baron"), who described him as "the British Boelcke".

Early life
Hawker was born on 30 December 1890 at Longparish, Hampshire, England, to Lieutenant Henry Colley Hawker, R.N., and Julia Gordon Lanoe Hawker, daughter of Major Peter William Lanoe Hawker, of the 74th Highlanders and sister of the author Mary Elizabeth Hawker ("Lanoe Falconer"). His parents were distant cousins; Hawker's father was of a cadet branch of the family resident in Australia since his own father, George Charles Hawker (son of Royal Navy Admiral Edward Hawker), emigrated in 1839, being elected Speaker of the House of Assembly, South Australia in 1860. The Hawker family had a military tradition, with army commissions being held in each generation since the time of Elizabeth I. A first cousin was Arthur Bagot, a naval officer in the First World War and Albert Medal recipient.

Lanoe was sent to Stubbington House School and at the age of 11 to the Royal Navy College in Dartmouth, but although highly intelligent and an enthusiastic sportsman, he suffered from a weak constitution, which led to jaundice. With the strenuous nature of a naval career unsuitable, he entered the Royal Military Academy, Woolwich before joining the Royal Engineers as an officer cadet. A clever inventor, Hawker developed a keen interest in all mechanical and engineering developments. During the summer of 1910 he saw a film featuring the Wright Flyer and after attending an aircraft flying display at Bournemouth, he quickly found an interest in aviation, learning to fly at his own expense at Hendon. On 4 March 1913, Hawker was awarded Aviator's Certificate No. 435 by the Royal Aero Club.

Promoted to 1st Lieutenant in October 1913 he was posted to Cork Harbour with the 33rd Fortress Company. His request for attachment to the Royal Flying Corps was granted and he reported to the Central Flying School at Upavon on 1 August 1914, three days before Britain entered the First World War.

With the Royal Flying Corps

Hawker was posted to France in October 1914, as a captain with No. 6 Squadron, Royal Flying Corps, flying Henri Farmans. The squadron converted to the B.E.2c and he undertook numerous reconnaissance missions into 1915, being wounded once by ground fire. On 22 April he was awarded the Distinguished Service Order for attacking a German zeppelin shed at Gontrode by dropping hand grenades at low level (below 200 ft) from his B.E.2c. He used a tethered German balloon to help shield him from enemy ground fire as he made successive attacks. During the Second Battle of Ypres, Hawker was wounded in the foot by ground fire. For the remainder of the battle he had to be carried to and from his aircraft, but refused to be grounded until the fight was over.

Returning to 6 Squadron after hospitalisation, the squadron now received several single-seat scouts, and some early F.E.2 'pushers'. One aircraft received was a Bristol Scout C, with RFC s/n 1609 that Hawker, with assistance from Air Mechanic Ernest Elton (who later became an Ace Pilot himself), equipped with their design of Lewis gun mount, enabling the machine gun to fire forward obliquely at an acute horizontal angle to the axis of flight, missing the propeller arc.

While with No 6 squadron in 1915, Captain Hawker was a comrade of Captain Louis Strange. The Squadron became pioneers of many aspects in military aviation at the time, driven largely by the imagination of Strange and the engineering talents of Hawker. Their talents led to various mountings for Lewis machine guns, one of which won Hawker the Victoria Cross, and one that nearly cost Strange his life.

Hawker's innovative ideas at this time greatly benefited the fledgling RFC. He helped to invent the Prideaux disintegrating link machine-gun belt feed, and initiated the practice of putting fabric protective coverings on the tips of wooden propellers, the use of fur-lined thigh boots, and devising a primitive 'rocking fuselage' for target practice on the ground. In 1916 he also developed (with W.L. French) the increased capacity 97-round 'double drum' for the Lewis machine gun. It was issued for trials in July and after modifications was issued generally to the RFC and RNAS.

Victoria Cross

Following an initial air victory in June, on 25 July 1915 when on patrol over Passchendaele, Captain Hawker attacked three German aircraft in succession, flying a different Bristol Scout C, serial No. 1611, after his earlier No. 1609 had been written off, transplanting the custom Lewis gun mount onto No. 1611. The first aerial victory for Hawker that day occurred after he had emptied a complete drum of bullets from his aircraft's single Lewis machine gun into it, sending it spinning down. The second was driven to the ground damaged, and the third – an Albatros C.I of FFA 3 – which he attacked at a height of about 10,000 feet, burst into flames and crashed. (Pilot Oberleutnant Uebelacker and observer Hauptmann Roser were both killed.) For this feat he was awarded the Victoria Cross, as the third military pilot (and the first fighter pilot) to receive the VC following William Barnard Rhodes-Moorhouse's pioneering award for bravery during a bombing raid, and Reginald Warneford's award for an anti-Zeppelin attack on an airborne Deutsches Heer airship, using aerial bombing to bring it down.

This particular sortie was just one of the many which Captain Hawker undertook during almost a year of constant operational flying and fighting. He claimed at least three more victories in August 1915, either in the Scout or flying an F.E.2.

Hawker was posted back to England in late 1915, with some seven victory claims (including one captured, three destroyed, one 'out of control' and one 'forced to land') making him the first British flying ace, and a figure of considerable fame within the ranks of the RFC.

It has since been argued that shooting down three aircraft in one mission was a feat repeated several times by later pilots, and whether Hawker deserved his Victoria Cross has been questioned. However, in the context of the air war of mid-1915 it was unusual to shoot down even one aircraft, and the VC was awarded on the basis that all the enemy planes were armed with machine guns. More significantly, by the early summer of 1915, the German Feldflieger Abteilung two-seater observation units of the future Luftstreitkräfte, had by this time, received examples of the Fokker Eindecker monoplane, with one Eindecker going to each unit, with a fixed, forward-firing machine gun fitted with a "synchronization gear" that prevented the bullets from striking the propeller. Therefore, the German pilots like Wintgens and Leutnant Otto Parschau, another pioneering Eindecker pilot, could employ the simple combat tactic of aiming the whole aircraft, and presenting a small target to the enemy while approaching from any angle, preferably from a blind spot where the enemy observer could not return fire.

Hawker flew before Britain had any workable synchroniser gear, so his Bristol Scout had its machine gun mounted on the left side of the cockpit, firing forwards and sideways at a 45 degree angle to avoid the propeller. The only direction from which he could attack an enemy was from its right rear quarter – precisely in a direction from which it was easy for the observer to fire at him. Thus, in each of the three attacks, Hawker was directly exposed to the fire of an enemy machine gun.

First Fighter Squadron

Promoted to major early in 1916. Hawker was placed in command of the RFC's first (single seater) fighter squadron, Number 24 based at Hounslow Heath Aerodrome and flying the Airco DH.2 pusher. After two fatalities in recent flying accidents, the new fighter, which featured a forward-mounted Lewis machine gun, soon earned a reputation for spinning; its rear mounted rotary engine and sensitive controls made it very responsive. Hawker countered this worry by taking a DH.2 up over the squadron base and, in front of the squadron pilots, put the aircraft through a series of spins, each time recovering safely. After landing, he carefully described to all pilots the correct procedures to recover from a spin. Once the pilots became used to the DH.2's characteristics, confidence in the aircraft rose quickly, as they came to appreciate its manoeuvrability.

He then led the squadron back to Bertangles, north of the Somme in February 1916, where the squadron quickly helped counter the Fokker Eindecker monoplanes of the Imperial German Army's Fliegertruppe which were dominant over the Western Front in the run up to the Somme offensive in July 1916. Hawker's aggressive personal philosophy of "Attack Everything", was the entire text of his tactical order of 30 June 1916. Spurred by his aggressiveness, 24 Squadron claimed some 70 victories by November at the cost of 12 of its own planes and 21 pilots killed, wounded or missing.
Around this time, Hawker developed a ring gunsight and created a clamp and spring-clip device to hold the Lewis in place on the DH.2. He also designed sheepskin boots that reached to the upper thigh, known as "fug-boots," which became standard issue to combat the risk of frostbite at high altitude.

By mid 1916, RFC policy was to ban squadron commanders from operational flying, Hawker included. However, he continued to make frequent offensive patrols and reconnaissance flights, particularly over the Somme battlefields.

As the year wore on, the Germans introduced far more potent fighters to the front, starting with the Luftstreitkräfte's first biplane fighter, the single-gun armed Halberstadt D.II, and shortly thereafter the even more advanced, twin-gunned Albatros D.I, rapidly making the DH.2 obsolete.

Death

On 23 November 1916, while flying an Airco DH.2 (Serial No. 5964), Hawker left Bertangles Aerodrome at 1300 hours as part of 'A' Flight, led by Captain (later Air Vice Marshal) J. O. Andrews and including Lieutenant (later Air Marshal) R.H.M.S Saundby. Andrews led the flight in an attack on two German aircraft over Achiet. Spotting a larger flight of German aircraft above, Andrews was about to break off the attack, but spotted Hawker diving to attack. Andrews and Saundby followed him to back him up in his fight; Andrews drove off one of the Germans attacking Hawker, then took bullets in his engine and glided out of the fight under Saundby's covering fire. Losing contact with the other DH.2s, Hawker began a lengthy dogfight with an Albatros D.II flown by Leutnant Manfred von Richthofen of Jasta 2. The Albatros was faster than the DH.2, more powerful and, with a pair of lMG 08 machine guns, more heavily armed. Richthofen fired 900 rounds during the running battle. Running low on fuel, Hawker eventually broke away from the combat and attempted to return to Allied lines. The Red Baron's guns jammed 50 yards from the lines, but a bullet from his last burst struck Hawker in the back of his head, killing him instantly. Richthofen claimed Hawker's Lewis gun from the wreck as a trophy and hung it above the door of his quarters. Major Lanoe George Hawker is listed on the Arras Flying Services Memorial for airmen lost with no known grave.

Legacy
Hawker's original Victoria Cross was lost when the Hawker family belongings were left behind after the fall of France in 1940. On their return after the Second World War, they found that their possessions, including the VC, had been stolen. A replacement was issued to Hawker's brother on 3 February 1960, and is now held by the Royal Air Force Museum, Hendon.

A window (designed by Francis Skeat) commemorating Hawker was installed in St Nicholas church, Longparish in 1967. The design features St Michael above an airfield with two pilots in the foreground. A copy of the window is in the Army Flying Museum at Middle Wallop.

Hawker was portrayed by Corin Redgrave in the 1971 film Von Richthofen and Brown. In the 2008 film The Red Baron, he was played by Richard Krajčo.

References

Bibliography

External links
Lanoe Hawker
 

1890 births
1916 deaths
Military personnel from Hampshire
Aviators killed by being shot down
Aviation pioneers
British Army personnel of World War I
British military personnel killed in World War I
British World War I flying aces
British World War I recipients of the Victoria Cross
Royal Flying Corps recipients of the Victoria Cross
Companions of the Distinguished Service Order
People from Longparish
Royal Engineers officers
Royal Flying Corps officers
Graduates of the Royal Military Academy, Woolwich
British Army recipients of the Victoria Cross
People educated at Stubbington House School
English aviators